= Pedophilia and Exhibitionism =

1964 book

- Title page for Pedophilia and Exhibitionism (1964)
- Author: Johann W. Mohr; Robert Edward Turner; Marian Bernice Jerry
- Language: English
- Series: Heritage
- Publisher: University of Toronto Press
- Publication date: 1964
- Publication place: Canada
- Pages: 224
- ISBN: 9781487576424

Pedophilia and Exhibitionism is a multidisciplinary book by Johann W. Mohr, Robert Edward Turner and Marian Bernice Jerry, published by the University of Toronto Press in 1964. It discusses what the authors said were the two most common sexual offenses of the time through clinical case studies from the Toronto Psychiatric Hospital's forensic clinic.

The book examines the differences between heterosexual and homosexual pedophiles. It also reported that there were differences between cases in which the child was a willing participant in the sexual acts and when they were not. The authors wrote that the psychological effects of the sexual acts on the child were dependent on the reactions of the parents, whose expressions of fear, hysteria and anger could cause the child to suffer lasting psychological effets. They further wrote that the interrogation and cross-examination of the child can be more psychologically damaging than the sexual act itself.

The researchers contradicted common myths popularized by mass media, including that sex offenders are commonly potential child murderers. In the preface, the authors wrote that "All too often the problems of the sexual offender are seen in terms of isolated but highly publicized cases of atrocities, with the result that the minor sex offender (who is by far in the majority) tends to be seen as a potential fiend and maniac."
